Litterer is a surname. Notable people with the surname include:

Joseph A. Litterer (1926–1995), American organizational theorist and professor
William Litterer (1834–1917), American politician